Walter José del Río, also known as Witcha (born June 16, 1976 in Baradero) is an  Argentine retired professional footballer. He also holds Italian citizenship.

References

1976 births
Living people
Argentine footballers
Boca Juniors footballers
Huracán Corrientes footballers
Argentine expatriate footballers
Expatriate footballers in England
Crystal Palace F.C. players
Expatriate footballers in Scotland
Scottish Premier League players
Dundee F.C. players
Expatriate footballers in Italy
Expatriate footballers in Switzerland
FC Wohlen players
Expatriate footballers in Spain
CF Extremadura footballers
SC Young Fellows Juventus players
CD San Fernando players
Argentine Primera División players
Argentine expatriate sportspeople in Italy
Argentine expatriate sportspeople in Spain
Argentine expatriate sportspeople in Scotland
Association football defenders
Argentine expatriate sportspeople in England
Argentine expatriate sportspeople in Switzerland
People from Baradero
Sportspeople from Buenos Aires Province